The Spectre of Lanyon Moor is a Big Finish Productions audio drama based on the long-running British science fiction television series Doctor Who.

Plot
The Sixth Doctor and Evelyn team up with the Brigadier to defeat an ancient evil in Cornwall.

Cast
The Doctor – Colin Baker
Evelyn Smythe – Maggie Stables
The Brigadier – Nicholas Courtney
Mrs Moynihan – Susan Jameson
Philip Ludgate – Barnaby Edwards
Professor Morgan – Toby Longworth
Sir Archibald Flint – James Bolam
Nikki Hunter – Helen Goldwyn
Pelagia Stamatis – Helen Goldwyn
Captain Ashforde – Nicholas Pegg
Corporal Croft – Helen Goldwyn

Notes
During the original run of Doctor Who (1963–1989), Nicholas Courtney appeared opposite all of the Doctors except the Sixth.  This audio fixes that omission. (Technically, they also meet—albeit briefly—in Dimensions in Time.) Courtney later appeared with the Eighth Doctor in Minuet in Hell, and with Tenth Doctor actor David Tennant in Sympathy for the Devil and UNIT: The Wasting (although Tennant was not playing The Doctor in these plays).

References

Several characters are mentioned by Emilia Rumford in Part Two of the televised story The Stones of Blood. Lexington-Smith is referenced and it may be assumed that Idwal Morgan, Professor of Megalithic Archaeology, is the character in this audio play.

Lanyon Moor also turns up in the opening moments of the first Tomorrow People audio.

External links
Big Finish Productions – The Spectre of Lanyon Moor

Sixth Doctor audio plays
2000 audio plays
UNIT audio plays
Fiction set in 2000